The 1985 All-Ireland Senior Camogie Championship was the high point of the 1985 season. The championship was won by Killkenny, who defeated Dublin by a five-point margin in the final for a first success in four years. The match drew an attendance of 3,500.

Semi-final
Marion McCarthy scored a goal direct from a puckout in the semi-final against Dublin. A fabulous goal by Jo Dunne and the fact that Geraldine Wynne’s lastminute close-in free sailed inches over the bar enabled Kilkenny to beat Wexford by 2–6 to 2–5.

Final
Dublin had high hopes. Cuchulainn Crumlin had won the club championship earlier in the year. and led by a wind assisted three points at half time but their challenge was a disappointment, despite Una Crowley scoring the game’s only goal. Angela Downey slipped over three quick points after the break, and Kilkenny were level within two minutes. Margaret Farrell added two points and Kilkenny were on top from then on.

Final stages

MATCH RULES
50 minutes
Replay if scores level
Maximum of 3 substitutions

See also
 All-Ireland Senior Hurling Championship
 Wikipedia List of Camogie players
 National Camogie League
 Camogie All Stars Awards
 Ashbourne Cup

References

External links
 Historical reports of All Ireland finals
 Camogie Association
 All-Ireland Senior Camogie Championship: Roll of Honour
 Camogie on facebook
 Camogie on GAA Oral History Project

1985 in camogie
1985